The 2012 Australian Manufacturers' Championship was a CAMS sanctioned Australian motor racing championship for modified production touring cars. The Manufacturers Championship was determined by a series pointscore for the manufacturers of the competing vehicles although the manufacturers themselves did not directly compete. The series also incorporated the 2012 Australian Production Car Championship, the 2012 Australian Production Car Endurance Championship and the 2012 Australian Endurance Championship, each of which was a drivers' title.

The 2012 Australian Manufacturers' Championship was the 27th manufacturers title to be awarded by CAMS and the 18th to be contested under the Australian Manufacturers' Championship name.

Class structure
Cars competing in the following seven classes:
 Class A : Extreme Performance
 Class B : High Performance
 Class C : Performance Touring
 Class D : Production Touring
 Class E : Compact Touring
 Class F : Hybrid/Alternative Energy
 Class I : Invitational (former Mini Challenge cars – not eligible for championship points)

There was little change from the 2011 class structure, although one new class, Class F for Hybrid/Alternative Energy vehicles was included. Despite its name however, the only eligible vehicles were existing diesel powered cars which had been moved from other classes into the new class.

Calendar
The championship was contested over a five-round series.

Points system
Each manufacturer could score class points towards the Australian Manufacturers' Championship title from the two highest placed automobiles of its make, in any class (excluding Class I). The title was awarded to the manufacturer that scores the highest total number of class points over all rounds of the championship. 
 In rounds with one scheduled race, points were awarded to manufacturers on a 120–90–72–60–54–48–42–36–30–24–18–12–6 basis for the first thirteen places in each class with 3 points for other finishers.
 In rounds with two scheduled races, points were awarded to manufacturers on a 60–45–36–30–27–24–21–18–15–12–9–6–3 basis for the first thirteen places in each class in each race with 2 points for other finishers.

Points towards the Australian Production Car Championship outright title were awarded to drivers based on outright finishing positions attained in each race. Points were awarded using the same two scales as used for the Australian Manufacturers' Championship with the addition of two points for the driver setting the fastest qualifying lap in each class at each round.

Points towards the Australian Production Car Championship class titles were awarded to drivers based on class finishing positions attained in each race. Points were awarded using the same two scales as used for the Australian Manufacturers' Championship with the addition of two points for the driver setting the fastest qualifying lap in each class at each round.

Drivers of Class I Invitational cars were not eligible to score points in any of the championships, and points were allocated in all cases as though Class I cars had not competed in the race.

Results

Australian Manufacturers' Championship

Australian Production Car Championship

Outright

Note: Drivers of Class I Invitational cars were not eligible to score points in any of the championships and points were allocated in all cases as though Class I cars were not competing in the race.

Classes
Class winners were:
 Class A – Stuart Kostera (Mitsubishi Lancer Evolution X)
 Class B – Grant Sherrin (BMW 135i)
 Class C – Adam Dodd (Mazda 3 MPS)
 Class D – Mark Eddy (Honda Integra)
 Class E – Grant Phillips (Proton Satria GTi)
 Class I - Michael Sherrin (Mini Cooper S)

Australian Endurance Championship
The Australian Endurance Championship was awarded to the drivers scoring the most points at Round 2 of the championship.

Whilst Jim Pollicina and Ryan Simpson were the winners of Round 2, a 60-point penalty was applied to the two drivers at that round. The 2012 Australian Endurance Championship was therefore awarded to Stuart Kostera and Ian Tulloch, who placed second at Round 2.

Australian Production Car Endurance Championship
The Australian Production Car Endurance Championship was awarded to the drivers scoring the most points at Round 2 of the championship.

Whilst Jim Pollicina and Ryan Simpson were the winners of Round 2, a 60-point penalty was applied to the two drivers at that round. The 2012 Australian Production Car Endurance Championship was therefore awarded to Stuart Kostera and Ian Tulloch, who placed second at Round 2.

References

External links
 Australian Manufacturers Championship
 Production Car Association of Australia 
 Natsoft Race Results Archive

Australian Manufacturers' Championship
Australian Production Car Championship
Manufacturers' Championship